Legislative Assembly elections were held in Jharkhand, India, from 30 November to 20 December 2019 to elect the 81 members of the 5th Jharkhand Legislative Assembly. Results were declared on 23 December 2019. The pre-election term of the Assembly was set to end on 27 December 2019.

Schedule
The schedule for the election proceedings was announced on 1 November 2019.

Parties and alliances













Surveys and polls

Opinion polls

Exit polls

Result

Alliance wise results 
Source:

Results by constituency

Government formation
After the defeat of the incumbent BJP government, incumbent Chief Minister Raghubar Das tendered his resignation from the post. He tendered his resignation to Governor Draupadi Murmu.

In the evening, during the election results, JMM leader and Former Chief Minister of Jharkhand Hemant Soren addressed the media and thanked the people of Jharkhand for the mandate. He also expressed his gratitude to his alliance partners, Congress & RJD and their president, Sonia Gandhi & Lalu Prasad Yadav respectively.

The next day on 24 December 2019, the meeting of all the 30 JMM MLAs was called, in which Hemant Soren was elected as the leader of the JMM legislature group. Hemant Soren was already the leader and Chief Ministerial candidate of the UPA during the election campaign. On the very same day, Alamgir Alam was elected as the leader of the Congress Legislative Party (CLP).

After the elections, JVM(P) chief and Former Chief Minister of Jharkhand Babulal Marandi extended the support of his party to the Hemant Soren government, thus providing more strength to the government.

On 24 December 2019, Hemant Soren along with the alliance partners, met Governor Draupadi Murmu and staked claim to form the government.

Bypolls 2019-2023

See also 
 2019 Indian general election in Jharkhand
 2019 elections in India

References

Jharkhand
December 2019 events in India
November 2019 events in India
State Assembly elections in Jharkhand
2010s in Jharkhand